Mahajati Sadan is an auditorium located on Chittaranjan Avenue in Kolkata, West Bengal, India. This auditorium is regularly used for Bengali theatres. Seminars are also organized in the seminal hall of Mahajati Sadan. This auditorium was an important part of India's freedom movement. Rabindranath Tagore called this auditorium "House of the Nation".

History
Subhas Chandra Bose made a request to Rabindranath Tagore to create an auditorium and in response to the request of Bose, Tagore laid the foundation stone of Mahajati Sadan 19 August 1939.
At the foundation-laying ceremony of Mahajati Sadan, Tagore told in his speech:

But, the disappearance of Bose stopped the construction work of this building. After the independence of India, Bidhan Chandra Roy showed his interest to complete the construction work of this building and thus "Mahajati Sadan Act 1949" was enacted for completion of the construction.

References

Bengali theatre
Culture of Kolkata
Theatres in Kolkata
Tourist attractions in Kolkata
Auditoriums in Kolkata